Beckenbauer Seur-In (born January 24, 1980) is a professional footballer from Thailand. He currently plays for Sriracha FC in the Thailand Division 1 League. He was born in Ayutthaya and was named after Franz Beckenbauer.

External links

Living people
Beckenbauer Seur-In
1980 births
Beckenbauer Seur-In
Association football forwards
Beckenbauer Seur-In
Beckenbauer Seur-In
Beckenbauer Seur-In